National Route 170 is a national highway of Japan connecting Takatsuki, Osaka and Izumisano, Osaka in Japan, with a total length of 74 km (45.98 mi).

History
Route 170 was originally designated on 18 May 1953 from Wakayama to Matsusaka (this was Route 41 from 1945-1953). After it was extended to Tsu, the route was redesignated as Route 42 on 1 April 1959. Route 170 was reassigned on a route from Takatsuki to Hashimoto on 1 April 1963. On 1 April 1982 the terminus was moved from Hashimoto to Izumisano.

References

External links
 

National highways in Japan
Roads in Osaka Prefecture